Stigma is an episode of the BBC's A Ghost Story for Christmas series, made in 1977. It was the first of only two stories set in the actual year of its making, and the last which mainstay Lawrence Gordon Clark would direct. It was first shown on BBC One on 29 December 1977 (postponed from its original scheduled broadcast date of 28 December), and was repeated on 29 May 1978. Scripted by Clive Exton, the thirty-minute piece stars Kate Binchy, Peter Bowles and Maxine Gordon.

Plot
The film concerns a family who have just moved into a cottage in the countryside. The cottage is situated near an ancient megalithic stone circle, and one of the stones is in the garden of the cottage. The family arranges to have the stone moved. However, as two workmen attempt to lift a large, heavy stone from their garden, an ancient curse is unleashed which causes the mother to bleed uncontrollably, despite having no wounds. Once the stone is finally moved, a skeleton is found buried there. The implication is that the mother's body is re-enacting the ritual execution of a witch who was buried under the stone centuries earlier.

Production
The production was filmed at Avebury, Wiltshire, which had also been the location used for the ITV series Children of the Stones (screened earlier the same year). The production is unlike the previous films in the Ghost Story For Christmas strand in several ways; it is the first to be an original story and the first to be set in the then-present day. Critical opinion is decidedly mixed, with the decision to move away from adaptations of classic ghost stories the main concern. David Kerekes, author of Creeping Flesh: The Horror Fantasy Film Book: Volume 1, suggested that "the problem is that this is not a ghost story. Stigma is a straight down the line horror story. Although it's a perfectly competent television production, it just doesn't fit in with the feel of what a Christmas ghost story should be."

Cast
Kate Binchy as Katharine
Peter Bowles as Peter
Maxine Gordon as Verity
Jon Laurimore as Dr. Hall
Christopher Blake as Richard
John Judd as Dave

Home media
"Stigma" was released on DVD by the British Film Institute in 2012. It was released on a single disc along with two other films from the Ghost Story for Christmas strand; "The Signalman" and "The Ice House". The DVD also contains bonus features including a 9-minute introduction to "Stigma" by director Lawrence Gordon Clark, and a booklet containing newly commissioned essays about the productions. It has also been included in a boxed set of all of the BBC's Ghost Stories for Christmas, released by the BFI the same year.

References

External links
 
 

1977 horror films
1977 films
1977 television films
BBC television dramas
British supernatural television shows
1970s ghost films
Films with screenplays by Clive Exton
Films about curses
Films set in 1977
Films shot in Wiltshire
British ghost films
A Ghost Story for Christmas
1970s British films